Matthieu Chemin (born 20 April 1984) is a French footballer who plays as a defender for Drapeau Fougères.

Career
In June 2016, Chemin joined Orléans, newly promoted to Ligue 2, after captaining Luçon in the third-tier Championnat National. He signed a one-year contract with an optional second.

After six months with no club, he signed with Les Herbiers in December 2018.

Chemin signed for Drapeau Fougères in June 2020.

References

1984 births
Footballers from Nantes
Living people
Association football defenders
French footballers
Ligue 2 players
FC Nantes players
FC Aurillac Arpajon Cantal Auvergne players
FC Libourne players
Luçon FC players
US Orléans players
Les Herbiers VF players